The 2015 Supercopa Centroamericana was an announced two-legged football match-up scheduled to be played in July and August 2015 between C.S. Cartaginés, winners of the 2014 Costa Rican Cup, and C.D. Olimpia, winners of the 2015 Honduran Cup.  It was intended to be the first edition of the competition; however, without further explanation from the organizers, the matches were never played.

Match details

First leg

Second leg

See also
2014 Costa Rican Cup
2015 Honduran Cup

References

2015
2015–16 in Costa Rican football
2015–16 in Honduran football